Euboea is the second-largest island in Greece. The word may also refer to:

Euboea (regional unit), an administrative division which includes the island
Euboea (mythology), the name of several women in Greek myths
1119 Euboea, an asteroid, named after the island
Euboea Montes, a volcano on the moon Io, also named after the island